Nsok is a town in Equatorial Guinea. It is located in the province of Wele-Nzas and has a (2005 est.) population of 4620.

Populated places in Wele-Nzas